Tharamatipet is a village in Ranga Reddy district in Telangana, India. It falls under Hayathnagar mandal. The nearest large town is Hyderabad; Taramathipet sits close to the Hyderabad Outer Ring Road.

Mula Mahesh Goud is the present sarpanch of Taramathipet, elected in 2019 after his five years as the mandal parishad territorial constituency member. His father, Sri Mula Chandraiah Goud, held the position for 30 years between 1960 and 1989. 
The major communities in Taramathipet are Gouds, Scheduled Castes and Kurumas.

The famous temples are Matha Mahankali Temple, Lord Shiva Temple, Hanuman Temple and 100 years old Masjid.

The major political parties are Indian National Congress, TRS, TDP and BJP

References

Villages in Ranga Reddy district